Dodangeh District is a district (bakhsh) in Sari County, Mazandaran Province, Iran. At the 2006 census, its population was 8,140, in 2,361 families.  The District has one city: Farim. The District has two rural districts (dehestan): Banaft Rural District and Farim Rural District.

References 

Sari County
Districts of Mazandaran Province